The women's slopestyle event in freestyle skiing at the 2014 Winter Olympics in Sochi, Russia took place 11 February 2014. In July 2011 slopestyle was added to the Olympic program, meaning the event made its debut in the 2014 Olympics.

Qualification

An athlete must have placed in the top 30 at a World Cup event after July 2012 or at the 2013 World Championships and a minimum of 50 FIS points. A total of 24 quota spots were available to athletes to compete at the games. A maximum of 4 athletes could be entered by a National Olympic Committee.

Maggie Voisin of the United States and Tiril Sjåstad Christiansen of Norway withdrew with injuries, meaning 22 athletes competed.

Results

Qualification
The qualification was held at 10:00.

Final
The final was started at 13:00.

References

Women's freestyle skiing at the 2014 Winter Olympics